The Ryūkyū scops-owl or elegant scops-owl (Otus elegans) is a small rufous-brown owl with a brown face disk and a cinnamon facial ruff. The bill is olive-grey and it has yellow eyes.

Distribution and habitat
It is found on the Ryukyu Islands of southern Japan, on Lanyu Island off south-east Taiwan, and on the Batanes and Babuyan Islands off northern Luzon, Philippines, in tropical or subtropical evergreen forest. It is becoming rare due to habitat loss.

Subspecies
 O. e. elegans (Cassin, 1852)	
 O. e. calayensis McGregor, 1904 
 O. e. interpositus Kuroda, 1923
 O. e. botelensis Kuroda, 1928 - Lanyu Scops Owl

Notes

References

BirdLife Species Factsheet - Elegant Scops-owl
 Birding in Taiwan

Otus (bird)
Birds of the Ryukyu Islands
Birds described in 1852
Endemic birds of Japan